Matthew Kent or Matt Kent may refer to:

 Matt Kent (born 1992), American baseball pitcher
 Matthew Kent (born 1980), Australian baseball player
Wheeler Antabanez (born 1977), alter-ego and pen name for American writer Matt Kent

See also
Kent (surname)